KLHT-FM (91.5 MHz) is a listener-supported, non-commercial FM radio station licensed to Honolulu, Hawaii.  The station is owned by Calvary Chapel of Honolulu, Inc., with studios and offices on Kono Mai Drive in Aiea.  Its format is a mix of contemporary worship music and Christian talk and teaching programs.  Music is heard during even hours and teaching programs air during odd hours.

KLHT-FM has an effective radiated power (ERP) of 100,000 watts, the maximum for most U.S. FM stations.  The transmitter is on Palehua Road in the Waianae Mountains, in Akupu, Hawaii.

History
Calvary Chapel was already operating an AM station in Honolulu, KLHT 1040 AM.  It wanted to add an FM station as well.  It applied for a construction permit to build a station on the 91.5 MHz frequency in 1996.  But it took 20 years to get the license and construct the station. 

The station was assigned the KLHT-FM call sign by the Federal Communications Commission on July 29, 2014.

References

External links
 Official Website
 

Radio stations established in 2016
2016 establishments in Hawaii
Radio stations in Honolulu
LHT-FM
Calvary Chapel Association